Martti Johannes Ingman (1907–1989) was a Finnish diplomat. He held a Master of Arts degree. Between 1956 and 1963 he first served as Envoy, then ambassador to Rio de Janeiro, Warsaw from 1963 to 1967 as ambassador, as well as Budapest 1969-1973. His father was Prime Minister and Archbishop Lauri Ingman.

References 

Ambassadors of Finland to Hungary
Ambassadors of Finland to Poland
1907 births
1989 deaths
Ambassadors of Finland to Brazil